The 2007 UAW-Ford 500 was the 30th stock car race of the 2007 NASCAR Nextel Cup Series and the fourth in the ten-race season-ending Chase for the Nextel Cup. It was held on October 7, 2007 at Talladega Superspeedway in Talladega, Alabama, before a crowd of 155,000. Jeff Gordon of Hendrick Motorsports won the 188-lap race starting from 34th position. His teammate Jimmie Johnson finished second and Dave Blaney was third.

The Car of Tomorrow debuted at a superspeedway, but it was heavily criticized for its lack of visibility, and drivers raised fears of becoming airborne if hit. Michael Waltrip won the pole position by posting the fastest lap in qualifying but was passed by Blaney by the end of the first lap. The race lead changed 42 times, with Denny Hamlin leading the most laps out of anybody else (40). Johnson took the lead after driving on the outside lane on lap 183. Johnson led as the final lap began, but Gordon went to the outside of the track, and was bump-drafted by Tony Stewart, allowing him to claim his fifth victory of the season, his sixth at Talladega Superspeedway, the 80th of his career, and he took over from Dale Earnhardt as the driver with the most restrictor plate wins, twelve.

The result advanced Gordon to the Drivers' Championship's lead, and his teammate Johnson (who led coming into the race) fell to second. The trio of Clint Bowyer, Tony Stewart, and Kevin Harvick retained third through fifth. Carl Edwards, Kurt Busch gained one position each, and Kyle Busch fell from fourth to eighth after being caught up in a multi-car accident. Chevrolet increased their unassailable lead in the Manufacturers' Championship, while Ford, Dodge and Toyota continued to occupy the remaining three places with six races left in the season.

Background 

The UAW-Ford 500 was the 30th of 36 scheduled stock car races of the 2007 NASCAR Nextel Cup Series and the fourth in the ten-race season-ending Chase for the Nextel Cup. It was held on October 7, 2007 at Talladega Superspeedway in Talladega, Alabama, a superspeedway that holds NASCAR races. The track's turns are banked at 33 degrees, while the front stretch, the location of the finish line, is banked at 16.5 degrees. The back stretch has a two-degree banking.

Before the race, Jimmie Johnson led the Drivers' Championship with 5,506 points, with teammate Jeff Gordon second and Clint Bowyer third. Tony Stewart and Kevin Harvick were fourth and fifth. Kyle Busch, Carl Edwards, Martin Truex Jr., Kurt Busch, Jeff Burton, Matt Kenseth and Denny Hamlin rounded out the top twelve drivers competing for the 2007 Chase for the Nextel Cup. Chevrolet led the Manufacturers' Championship with 232 points, sixty ahead of Ford in second. Dodge with 147 points was 56 ahead of Toyota in fourth. Brian Vickers was the race's defending champion.

The UAW-Ford 500 marked the début of the Car of Tomorrow on a superspeedway. NASCAR mandated teams to run flat side plates instead of the a curved side plate, and some cars had to make minor adjustments to pass pre-race inspection. Nextel Cup Series Director John Darby stated NASCAR changed the wording of the regulations to provide clarity and to have a starting point in controlling top speeds, "Basically, it says we're going to start out with this size of a restrictor plate, and if everything proves out OK, we'll leave it, but the ultimate restrictor-plate size won't be determined until the conclusion of final Cup practice." Drivers spent one and a half days in mid-September testing the Car of Tomorrow at the track.

There were two changes of driver heading into the race. It was announced that open-wheel driver Jacques Villeneuve would début in the No. 27 Bill Davis Racing car five weeks earlier than planned. Villeneuve planned to compete in the ARCA Re/Max and Craftsman Truck Series races at Talladega, but was granted approval to race in the Nextel Cup Series after testing of the Car of Tomorrow at the track. Villeneuve said he was delighted to debut in the Nextel Cup Series: "It's perfect. I'm really happy that NASCAR has given me its approval so quickly, and having run Talladega with the Cup drivers, I'm really looking forward to it. It's a huge step in my learning process." Mike Wallace replaced his younger brother Kenny Wallace in the No. 88 Robert Yates Racing car while the team's regular driver Ricky Rudd continued to recover from a shoulder injury.

Practice and qualifying 

Two 60-minute practice sessions were held on the Friday before Sunday's race. Stewart set the fastest time in the first practice session with a lap of 49.118 seconds. Jeff Gordon was second-fastest. Positions three through ten were filled by Ken Schrader, Robby Gordon, Kyle Petty, Kasey Kahne, David Stremme, Martin Truex Jr., Greg Biffle, and Burton. Hamiln was forbidden by NASCAR to partake in its closing minutes because he was observed bump-drafting other cars. Darby explained that Hamlin was the most aggressive driver out of all those cautioned by NASCAR. Later that day, Stewart led the second practice session with a lap of 49.347 seconds; Paul Menard was 0.045 seconds slower in second. Kyle Busch, Kurt Busch, Jamie McMurray, Truex, Burton, Jeff Green, Tony Raines, and Johnny Sauter were in positions three through ten. After practice, drivers complained of hindered visibility at the front of the car, due to a larger cockpit and spoiler. They felt this had the potential to cause a multi-car accident, and were worried about the possibility of getting airborne if hit by others.

Fifty-one cars were entered in the qualifier on Saturday afternoon, according to NASCAR's qualifying procedure, forty-three were allowed to race. Each driver ran two laps, with the starting order determined by the competitor's fastest times. Toyotas took five of the first six spots, as Michael Waltrip clinched the fourth pole position of his career, and his first since the 2005 Pocono 500, with a time of 50.648 seconds. He was joined on the grid's front row by Dave Blaney whose lap was 0.062 seconds slower. Vickers qualified in third. Fourth was Joe Nemechek, and David Reutimann fifth. The next three spots on the grid was composed of drivers who were required to qualify on time or risk missing the race: Villeneuve, John Andretti, and Bobby Labonte. Kahne and Elliott Sadler completed the top ten. Of the drivers in the chase, Stewart started 11th, Truex 13th, Hamlin 18th, and Johnson 19th. The eight drivers who failed to qualify were A. J. Allmendinger, Boris Said, Scott Riggs, Sam Hornish Jr., Jeremy Mayfield, Sterling Marlin, Ward Burton and Kevin Lepage. Kurt Busch and David Ragan's cars were found to be too low at the front during post-qualifying inspection, and were mandated to start at the back of the field. Afterward, Waltrip said, "I felt confident yesterday that we would make the race. Our qualifying lap was faster than what we ran in practice. If I only had to worry about my car, I would've been happier."

Qualifying results

Race 
Live television coverage of the race on ABC began at 1:00 p.m. Eastern Daylight Time. A moment of silence was held in honor of former NASCAR president Bill France Jr. Frank Stark of Raceway Ministries began pre-race ceremonies with an invocation. Miss University of Alabama Stephanie Shelton performed the national anthem, and Dave Sparks, an employee of the race's sponsor, commanded the drivers to start their engines. During the pace laps, McMurray moved to the rear of the field because he changed his engine, and Casey Mears did the same for illegal adjustments to his car.

The race started at 2:21 p.m. Waltrip led the pack on the run to the first corner, but Blaney got ahead of him to take the first position at the end of the first lap. On lap two, Labonte made it three-abreast going to the finish line, and took the lead, before losing it to Vickers on the following lap. Waltrip steered right to reclaim first place on lap four, and held it for the next lap when Labonte returned to the head of the pack. The sixth lap had Robby Gordon pushed by other cars to become the new leader, which he retained until Vickers returned to the front on lap nine. In the meantime, Hamlin moved from eighteenth to fourth. He took the lead for the first time with assistance from Andretti on lap 12. The first caution was necessitated on lap 17 as Andretti's right-front tire blew, removing one of his car's fenders, and scattering debris on the track. Most of the leaders, including Hamlin, made pit stops for fuel, tyres and car adjustments. Petty led the field for one lap before making his stop on the 20th lap, and Johnson was the leader on the next lap before doing the same.

Hamlin led the field back up to speed at the lap-22 restart, and was followed by Kahne, Truex, and Sadler. Three laps later, Harvick provided Sadler assistance to claim the lead on the left lane. However, Sadler lost the lead to Hamlin on lap 27, as some competitors created three-abreast racing by forming a middle lane. The outside lane was used by Truex to gain first place on lap 30. Dale Earnhardt Jr. moved to the lead on the 31st lap. He maintained it for the next 27 laps as the first round of green flag pit stops commenced. After the pit stops, Hamlin regained the lead. On lap 63, David Gilliland collided with Biffle at turn four, causing Biffle to spin sideways. Biffle's front-left tire went flat, and the front of Gilliland's vehicle sustained light damage. The second caution was waved to restore order. Some cars in the middle of the pack went down pit road to stop for fuel and tyres. Gilliland's mechanics made repairs to his car. The race restarted on lap 67 as Hamlin led Stewart and Kyle Busch in a single file line.

Waltrip returned to the lead on lap 88, as Reutimann got into second by joining the pack of cars on the bottom line. Reutimann passed Waltrip for first on the following lap. On lap 91, Earnhardt led once again by driving on the outside lane. Two laps later, Jeff Burton's engine failed, laying oil and debris on the track, and calling for the race's third caution as he returned to pit road to retire. Pit stops for fuel and tyres were made by several drivers during the caution. Waltrip led the restarted race on lap 96. He held it until Hamlin took it as the lead group of cars went three-abreast on lap 98. Stewart became the leader for the first time by driving on the outside lane one lap later. Three abreast-racing temporarily ended on lap 101, as the main pack of cars fell into a single line behind Stewart. Sadler took the lead with assistance from Kahne on the inside line on the 109th lap. Four laps later, Truex's engine blew, leaving oil on the track, and requiring a fourth caution.

Most drivers, including Sadler, elected to make pit stops for fuel and tyres under the caution period. Bowyer and Sadler each led for one lap before making their pit stops. Sadler returned to the lead for the restart on lap 116 as the pack formed into one single file. On lap 132, Villeneuve scraped the wall alongside the track, but he continued without significant damage. Labonte received assistance from Stewart to move past Sadler for the lead on the 133rd lap. On the following lap, Stewart took the lead for himself. Vickers passed Stewart on the outside to claim the first position on lap 135. Lap 136 saw the race's fifth caution: Earnhardt's laid oil on the track after his engine failed. Dale Jarrett attempted to avoid other cars, but he sustained damage to the front-right corner of his car, stopping on the apron. Vickers and the rest of the leaders chose to make pit stops for fuel and tyres while the caution was out. Sauter won the race off pit road, and led at the lap 140 restart. Jeff Gordon was required to drive down pit road as soon as the race resumed for a team equipment penalty in his pit stall.

The main pack of cars again formed a single line as Stewart returned to first place on the 141st lap. On lap 145, a multi-car accident prompted the sixth caution. Labonte lost control of his car in turn four, and slid down into Kyle Busch. He then ricocheted into Robby Gordon, Reutimann slid as Ragan had no space to negotiate through and ran into him. Other drivers involved in the collision were McMurray, Kenseth, Menard, Stremme, Vickers and Hamlin. Most drivers, including Stewart, made pit stops for fuel to allow them to complete the race. Raines led the field at the restart on lap 150, On the next lap, Ryan Newman received assistance from his teammate Kurt Busch to take the lead. Stewart overtook Newman to retake first on lap 152. The seventh caution was waved one lap later for Schrader whose right-front tire blew, causing him to clout the turn four wall.

Stewart kept the lead at the lap-156 restart. Another six laps passed until the eighth caution was called for, when Petty's tire blew and he crashed into the turn three wall. As with the previous restart, Stewart maintained the lead on lap 166. Blaney and Johnson formed a bottom line of around seven cars in an attempt to gain on Stewart. However, the top five of Stewart, Newman, Kurt Busch, Juan Pablo Montoya, and Kahne temporarily split from the rest of the pack by the 173rd lap. This was the case until the next lap when Stewart tried to block on both lanes, but Newman found a way past him to reclaim the lead. On lap 176, the ninth (and final) caution was waved as Waltrip's right-front tire blew in turn one. He clipped the rear of Sadler's car, and then clouted a wall; Sadler spun and collected Biffle and Raines. Newman led the field at the restart on lap 180 with Busch second and Montoya third. Stewart turned onto the bottom lane so he could try and establish a second line of cars This proved successful as the Hendrick Motorsports duo of Johnson and Jeff Gordon were on the bottom lane, and caught Newman on the 182nd lap.

Newman lost the lead to Johnson on the following lap. Stewart tried to pass Johnson on lap 184, but could not do so as no other driver steered to the middle lane to provide him with assistance. The right lane had Newman and his teammate Kurt Busch driving on it. The two caught Johnson and his teammate Jeff Gordon on the 185th lap. Stewart linked up with Busch and Newman the lap after, and went to the outside with Jeff Gordon and Johnson remaining on the inside. On the final lap, Jeff Gordon turned right, and got in between his teammate Johnson and Newman and Kurt Busch. As Johnson went to block his teammate, Stewart bump-drafted Jeff Gordon to give the latter the lead, which he held to clinch his fifth victory of the season, the 80th of his career, and a season sweep of victories at Talladega Superspeedway. He also took his sixth win at Talladega Superspeedway, and suppressed Dale Earnhardt to become the new all-time wins leader at restrictor-plate tracks with twelve. Johnson finished second, Blaney came third, Hamlin took fourth and Newman placed fifth. Mears, Kurt Busch, Stewart, Raines and Reed Sorenson completed the top ten. The race had a total of nine cautions and 42 lead changes by 22 different drivers. Hamlin led five times for a total of 40 laps, more than any other competitor.

Post-race comments 
Jeff Gordon appeared in Victory Lane after his victory lap to celebrate his fifth win of the season in front of the crowd of 155,000 people; the win earned him $246,036. He called it "the hardest three-quarters of a race that I've ever had to run before," after qualifying was influential in determining his strategy for the race, "We avoided the wrecks and all of a sudden found ourselves in the top 15 with about 25–30 to go, and we held on there. What I don't understand is how I got by my teammate. I got a couple of pushes. When it got three-wide, I thought, 'This is my opportunity.' Luckily when I got high, and Jimmie tried to block me, the 20 was there and had nowhere to go. He's the one who pushed me to the front." Johnson said his second-place finish was not something he was happy with since he was passed by his teammate, "To get that close and not win is a letdown. There must have been stuff going on behind me that I couldn't see, but Jeff could in his mirror, and he pulled up and got in front of the 20 [Stewart] and was able to take advantage of that push." Third-placed Blaney revealed his team's objective was to preserve his car and return to the top 35 in points, "I didn't want to do anything to put it in harm's way. I was way more cautious than I probably wanted to be. I just got with the right group of cars there at the end."

Reaction to the Car of Tomorrow's debut at a superspeedway was negative. Newman stated his feeling that the racing "not very good" as he observed the single file driving, which he felt was not racing to him, "I hope it wasn’t what NASCAR intended with this car. I’m not complaining about the car because the old car did relatively the same thing. We gotta do something where we can race a little bit. I mean I was driving around with one hand running 15th just riding, on and off the gas. It’s not racing. If we’re going to do that why don’t we just make it a 100-mile race and we’ll tear them all up in the first 50?” Jeff Gordon spoke of how boredom affected him during the race, and called for more work on the car to prevent single-file racing, "I think we would never race like that if we didn't have the closing rate that we have, and [with] the bump-drafting being so drastic that I think we need to make some adjustments here." Kenseth said his strategy was to run at the rear of the pack, and believed spectators did not want to see that, adding, "We rode around for about 350–400 miles and then sooner or later you’ve got to go race and try to get a partner up there and see how your car is gonna handle. When we decided to go up there, we got up to the third or fourth row on the inside and then the leader wrecked. When the leader wrecks, there’s not a whole lot you can do to miss it.”

Two days after the race, Chip Ganassi Racing was given penalties for Sorenson's car. The penalties for "actions detrimental to stock car racing"; "car, car parts, components and/or equipment used do not conform to NASCAR rules" and for the front of the car failing to meet the minimum ride height restrictions as imposed by the regulations for the Car of Tomorrow during post-race inspection, included a $25,000 fine for crew chief Jimmy Elledge, who was placed on probation until December 31, 2007. Team owner Chip Ganassi and Sorenson were penalized 25 points in the Owners and Drivers' Championships. The result gave Jeff Gordon a six-point lead over teammate Johnson in the Drivers' Championship. Bowyer, Stewart and Harvick stayed in positions third through fifth. Edwards and Kurt Busch advanced to sixth and seventh, while Kyle Busch, Hamlin, and Truex completed out the top ten placings. In the Manufacturers' Championship, Chevrolet (with 271 points) increased its unassailable lead. Ford maintained second with 175 points, Dodge stayed in third with 149 points, and Toyota retained fourth with 97 points with six races left in the season. The race took three hours, 29 minutes and 11 seconds to complete, and the margin of victory was 0.066 seconds.

Race results

Standings after the race 

Drivers' Championship standings

Manufacturers' Championship standings

 Note: Only the top twelve positions are included for the driver standings. These drivers qualified for the Chase for the Nextel Cup.

References 

UAW-Ford 500
UAW-Ford 500
NASCAR races at Talladega Superspeedway
October 2007 sports events in the United States